The Central American Cup is an upcoming annual continental club football competition to be organized by CONCACAF. It will be contested by clubs from Central America and serve as that region's qualifying tournament to CONCACAF Champions League.

On 21 September 2021 CONCACAF announced plans for an expansion of the Champions League tournament from 16 to 27 teams beginning in 2024. As part of the restructuring, regional qualification tournaments will be held for teams from North America, Central America, and the Caribbean beginning in 2023. The Central American Cup will replace CONCACAF League as the sole method of qualification to Champions League for teams from Central America.

Format
The tournament will be divided into a group phase and a knockout phase. In the first phase, the 20 teams will be divided into four groups of five. Teams will play one game against each team in their group and the top-two teams in each group will advance to the knockout phase. The knockout phase will consist of four rounds plus a play-in round for the losers of the quarterfinals.

The two play-in round winners and the four quarterfinal winners qualify for the CONCACAF Champions League. The winner of the Central American Cup will receive a first round bye and qualify directly to the Champions League Round of 16.

Qualification 
A total of 20 teams representing all seven Central American Football Union members will qualify based on the results of their domestic league seasons. The qualification criteria for 18 of the berths is as follows:

3 clubs from  Costa Rica
3 clubs from  El Salvador
3 clubs from  Guatemala
3 clubs from  Honduras
3 clubs from  Panama
2 clubs from  Nicaragua
1 club from  Belize

For the 2023 edition, Costa Rica and Honduras will be awarded an extra slot by having clubs reach the finals of the 2022 CONCACAF League. Distribution of the final two slots in future years is to be determined.

See also
 CONCACAF League
 Copa Interclubes UNCAF
 Leagues Cup

References

CONCACAF club competitions
Central American Football Union competitions
Recurring sporting events established in 2021